CBiPES is a drug used in scientific research that acts as a selective positive allosteric modulator for the metabotropic glutamate receptor group II subtype mGluR2. It has potentially antipsychotic effects in animal models, and is used for researching the role of mGluR2 receptors in schizophrenia and related disorders.

References 

Antipsychotics
MGlu2 receptor agonists
MGlu3 receptor agonists